Evil: Live is a live album released by the American rock band Lynch Mob in 2003.

Track listing

Personnel
 Robert Mason – vocals
 George Lynch – guitar
 Anthony Esposito – bass guitar
 Mick Brown – drums

Additional personnel
Peter Towler – Design, Photography
Don C. Tyler – Digital Remastering

References

Lynch Mob (band) albums
2003 live albums